Angela Mary Flowers (born 19 December 1932) is a British gallerist who founded Flowers Gallery, a commercial art gallery that today operates in London, New York City and Hong Kong. She remains a director of the gallery and is currently based between Ramsgate in Kent and Cork in Ireland.

Education and career 
Born in Croydon, Angela Holland was the eldest of two daughters of Geoffrey and Olive Holland (her great grandfather founded The Croydon Advertiser). During World War II, her father worked as a fireman on the River Thames, then in military intelligence; her mother worked in a munitions factory in Herefordshire; during this time, Angela was sent to a boarding school founded by war artist Eric Kennington. She then went to Westonbirt School in Kent, followed by Wychwood School in Oxford and a spell as an au pair in Paris.

In 1952, aged 19, she met fashion and portrait photographer Adrian Flowers, marrying him seven weeks later ("I met Adrian in the January and proposed to him in the February because it was leap year ... and we got married a few weeks later"). She studied drama and music at the Guildhall School of Music and Drama in London, and did some music and acting work, and also worked in advertising.

Her arts career began following a family holiday with Adrian to St Ives, where they met many of the resident artists. Adrian began taking pictures of the artworks and artists for catalogues and together they began collecting art, with a particular focus on emerging British artists.

Flowers Gallery
Flowers Gallery opened in central London in 1970 in an attic of the Artists' International Association in Lisle Street. The gallery's first show featured Patrick Hughes, which Flowers continued to represent for 48 years; printmaker Tom Phillips had his first solo show at Flowers, also in 1970. The following year, in 1971, the gallery hosted a first solo show by Fionnuala Boyd and Leslie Evans, and in 1973, it hosted Opening, a show by feminist Penny Slinger dealing with food and eroticism.

In 1988, Flowers moved the gallery to an industrial building in the Hackney district of east London, later partially returning to central London by opening a second gallery in Cork Street. In 2002, the east London gallery moved to Shoreditch.

Flowers expanded internationally in 1997, opened a US gallery in Los Angeles, then moving it to New York in 2003, located initially in Madison Avenue before moving to West 20th street in Chelsea in 2009.

From December 2012 to February 2013, the Shoreditch gallery hosted an exhibition, Angela Flowers at 80, marking her 80th birthday.

Personal life
Angela and Adrian had four children: Adam, Matthew, Daniel and Francesca. Matthew Flowers, her second son, worked on and off for the gallery from 1970 until 1983 when he moved to the business full time. He became its managing director in 1989.

In 1970, Angela Flowers met the writer and business journalist Robert Heller. Already an art collector, he helped manage the gallery. She and Adrian Flowers divorced in 1972, and she and Heller stayed together. In 1999, she said "We've been together 29 years now and I'm still hoping to get married. Perhaps I'll ask him next year, which is a leap year." They married in 2003. He died in 2012. Angela and Robert had a daughter, Rachel Heller, born on 15 September 1973, who was born with Down's syndrome. Rachel is an artist and is represented by Flowers Gallery.

References 

1932 births
Living people
English art dealers
People from Croydon
People educated at Westonbirt School